Nueva Ilussion (Eng.: New Illusion) is the first studio album released by the Mexican band Majestad de la Sierra. The album was supposed to be released in late December 2008 but was pushed back to March 10, 2009.

Background
Before the band was formed, Beto Durán, Luis Diaz and five other people were secretly recording the album without anyone knowing except Miguel Galindo, the lead vocalist from K-Paz de la Sierra.

Track listing
Source:
 Mi Obsesión
 Si Te Pudiera Mentir
 Dulcemente Enamorada
 Me Hice Una Promesa
 Hubiera Dado Todo Por Ti
 Uno, Dos Y Tres
 Renunciacion
 Así Fue
 Te Juro (I Swear)
 Dulce Despertar
 Quién Quiere Bailar
 Qué Pena

References

2009 albums
Spanish-language albums
Majestad de la Sierra albums
Disa Records albums